Bangladesh Nursing and Midwifery Council is a Bangladesh government regulatory agency under the Ministry of Health and Family Welfare responsible for nursing services and education. Rashida Akhter is the head of the council.

History
Bangladesh Nursing and Midwifery Council traces its origins to East Pakistan Nursing Council, which was established in 1952 as a regulatory agency on nursing services and education. In 1971, following the Independence of Bangladesh, East Pakistan Nursing Council was renamed to Bangladesh Nursing and Midwifery Council.

References

1971 establishments in Bangladesh
Organisations based in Dhaka
Government agencies of Bangladesh